Ha Ling Peak is a peak at the northwestern end of Ehagay Nakoda — a mountain located immediately south of the town of Canmore just east of the Spray Lakes road in Alberta's Canadian Rockies.  It was previously named Chinaman's Peak but the name was changed to be less offensive. It was the subject of a 2018 CBC Documentary titled 'Ha Ling Peak' that follows the controversy and renaming of the mountain .

Origin of the name
The name of the mountain has been subject to much controversy. Originally, the mountain was referred to locally as The Beehive. In 1896 Ha Ling, a Chinese cook for the Canadian Pacific Railway (some say the Okaloosa Hotel in Canmore) was bet 50 dollars that he could not climb the peak and plant a flag on the summit in less than 10 hours. According to the Medicine Hat News of October 22, 1896, he started the ascent at 7:00 am the previous Saturday morning and was back in time for lunch.  As nobody believed his story, he led a party of doubters to the summit where he planted a much larger flag beside the original, this one visible to the naked eye from Canmore. The townsfolk referred to the mountain as Chinaman's Peak in his honour.

The name Chinaman's Peak did not become official until 1980. Later, in 1997 it was renamed Ha Ling Peak as the term Chinaman was viewed as derogatory.

Climbing routes
There is a hiking route up the south side.  On the north side there are several technical climbing routes up the face and a difficult scrambling route up Canmore Couloir, located between Mount Lawrence Grassi and Miner's Col.

See also
 Canmore Museum and Geoscience Centre
 Chinaman (term)
 List of mountains in the Canadian Rockies
 Negro Mountain

References

External links
 Scramble description from www.scrambling.ca
 
 Ha Ling Peak Hiking Trail from hikealberta.com

Two-thousanders of Alberta
History of Alberta
Canadian people of Chinese descent
Ethnic and religious slurs
Asian-American issues
Anti-Chinese sentiment in Canada
Alberta's Rockies